Goniobranchus vibratus, common name trembling nudibranch, is a species of colourful sea slug, a dorid nudibranch, a marine gastropod mollusc in the family Chromodorididae.

Etymology
The Latin species name vibratus derives from its habit of vibrating the gills rhythmically much like some species of Thorunna and Noumea.

Distribution
This species was described from Hawaii. It has been reported in the Marshall Islands, in French Polynesia and in Japan, in the tropical Pacific Ocean.

Habitat

Description

The length of the body reaches 60–65 mm. The basic body colour of these nudibranchs is bright yellow, with small white dots in relief. The margins of the mantle are bluish-purple, with large white pustules. The outline of the body is oblong or oval. Mantle is smooth and rounded. The thin margins do not conceal the foot behind. The seven brachial plumes are small, erect, ciliated and edged with violet. Dorsal tentacles are violet, short, ovate and lamellated. Foot is white and almost wide as the mantle.

Biology
Goniobranchus vibratus feeds on  encrusting sponges (Porifera, Phoriospongia poni or probably Chelonaplysilla violacea). It lays a mass of eggs in a ribbon of 2-3 whorls. Hatching occurs in about 7 days.

References

Chromodorididae
Gastropods described in 1860
Taxa named by William Harper Pease